BugSat 1 (nickname Tita) is an Argentine microsatellite launched on 19 June 2014. The satellite is built in flattened box shape, optimized for piggy-back launch. All instruments are powered by solar cells mounted on the spacecraft body. The satellite is running the Debian operating system.

Launch 
BugSat 1 was launched from Dombarovsky Air Base, site 13, Russia, on 19 June 2014 by a Dnepr rocket. Although there has been no official release, amateur radio operators have succeeded in downloading status data from the satellite.

Mission 
The satellite is intended primarily for technology verification in space, mostly of Earth observation telescope. Also, after the end of the primary mission phase, the satellite will serve the amateur radio community by providing a digipeater service.

See also 

 2014 in spaceflight

References

External links 
 http://lu4eou.blogspot.com.ar/

Amateur radio satellites
Satellites of Argentina
Spacecraft launched in 2014
2014 in Argentina
Spacecraft launched by Dnepr rockets